Syms by Sinatra is a 1982 album by Sylvia Syms, arranged by Don Costa, and conducted by Frank Sinatra .

Track listing
 "Hooray for Love" (Harold Arlen, Leo Robin) 
 "All My Tomorrows" (Sammy Cahn, Jimmy Van Heusen)
 "By Myself" (Arthur Schwartz, Howard Dietz)
 "You Go to My Head" (J. Fred Coots, Haven Gillespie)
 "Close Enough for Love" (Johnny Mandel, Paul Williams)
 "Them There Eyes" (Maceo Pinkard, William Tracey, Doris Tauber)
 "Someone to Light Up My Life" (Antônio Carlos Jobim, Gene Lees, Vinicius de Moraes)
 "I Thought About You" (Johnny Mercer, Van Heusen)
 "You Must Believe in Spring" (Alan Bergman, Marilyn Bergman, Michel Legrand, Jacques Demy)
 "Old Devil Moon" (E.Y. Harburg, Burton Lane)

Personnel
 Sylvia Syms - vocals
 Frank Sinatra - conductor
 Don Costa - arranger
 Vincent Falcone, Jr.

1982 albums
Albums conducted by Frank Sinatra
Reprise Records albums
Sylvia Syms (singer) albums
Albums produced by Don Costa
Albums arranged by Don Costa